Mary Veronica Hardy (14 October 1931 – 4 to 7 January 1985) was an Australian television and radio presenter, actress, writer and comedian. She was best known for her caustic wit, indifference to authority and tireless ability to ad lib. On receiving one of her many Logie Awards, she quipped: “In all sincerity I don’t want to thank anybody”.

Biography 
Mary Hardy was born in Warrnambool and brought up in Bacchus Marsh. The youngest of eight children; her parents were Winifred Mary (née Bourke) and Thomas John Hardy; the author Frank Hardy was her brother. Her professional acting career began in 1950, when she was noticed by J. C. Williamson, where she worked for several years in various productions. In 1957, as Peter in the J. C. Williamson production of Peter Pan, Hardy first became known as a star, proving to be a huge success.

The following year, after Hardy's nomination for "Actress of the Year" for her role as Frankie in A Member of the Wedding, the recently formed Union Theatre Repertory Company offered Mary a permanent position joining actors such as Noel Ferrier, Frank Thring, Toni Lamond and Fred Parslow. She first appeared with UTRC as the cabin boy Pip in Moby Dick—Rehearsed.

The move from theatre to television came via the late night satirical revues for which Hardy wrote. Initially these were at the Arlen Theatre in St. Kilda with, amongst others, Noel Tovey. Later she would perform at the Phillip Theatre in Sydney with Jill Perryman, Gordon Chater and Judi Farr. In 1964 Noel Ferrier asked Hardy if she would return to Melbourne to join him on television in In Melbourne Tonight. At the same time she also began co-hosting a morning radio program on 3UZ, which was to become the most popular afternoon radio program for five years.  Earlier, she had presented a program on 3XY and was later heard on 3AW for many years.

Both these live programs allowed Hardy to ad-lib. She was very successful and won seven Logie awards  for Best Female Personality. Proving to be too successful, especially at the expense of male comedians, Hardy was sacked from GTV-9. She later said "Before I came on the scene, if you were a woman on television, you were barrel girl, a weather girl or a wheel spinner...".

Hardy returned to the theatre and in 1969 was awarded the Rosa Ribush Award for "Best Supporting Actress" for her role as Agnes in Mame.

In 1971 Hardy signed up with HSV-7 to co-host The Penthouse Club with Mike Williamson, where telecasts of harness racing, then known as "the trots", were interspersed with live variety. After Williamson left the show, Hardy's co-hosts included Ernie Sigley and Bill Collins She was suspended from the show in late 1974 for swearing, but was later reinstated.

In the 1970s she also worked at radio station 3AW.

The stress of her career in radio and television was considerable and in May 1977, Hardy collapsed on set. She was admitted to a private hospital for two weeks, and later gave several interviews about what the studio called a 'virus' which had officially struck her down. But she made no attempt to hide her perilous state saying "You're just hanging by a bit of a string and sometimes they let go of the string and you fall down".

Over the next two years, the 'rests' between shows, the live 'walkouts' on air and brief stays in hospital became more frequent and she left The Penthouse Club in late 1978. After winning her seventh and final Logie, knowing that her long-running command over variety television was coming to an end, she said "I really have to thank Graham Kennedy for this. If he hadn't got me the sack all those years ago, I would not have gone to Seven".

Death
Hardy committed suicide between 4 and 7 January 1985, and was buried in the Cheltenham Memorial Park.

Family and tributes 
In 1987 Hardy's brother Frank wrote a play Mary Lives!, celebrating her life, which was staged in Melbourne at the Malthouse Theatre.

In February 2008 ABC TV broadcast a 30-minute documentary on Hardy's life entitled IOU: Mary Hardy.

Her grandniece is Australian writer and media personality Marieke Hardy.

References

 Frank Hardy: Politics, Literature, Life,  Jenny Hocking (South Melbourne: Lothian Books, 2005)

External links
  Remembering madcap Mary – article in The Age about the 2008 documentary
 "Madcap Mary: A Hardy Life" in Newsletter of Friends of Cheltenham and Regional Cemeteries Inc.

Australian television actresses
Australian women comedians
Australian people of English descent
1931 births
1985 suicides
People from Bacchus Marsh
Suicides in Victoria (Australia)
20th-century Australian actresses
20th-century Australian comedians
1985 deaths
3AW presenters
Actresses from Victoria (Australia)